Jonathan Beason (born January 14, 1985) is a former American football linebacker who played in the National Football League (NFL). He played college football at the University of Miami, and was drafted by the Carolina Panthers in the first round of the 2007 NFL Draft. He also played for the New York Giants.

Early years
Beason attended Chaminade Madonna College Preparatory School from 1999–2003. He played multiple positions including linebacker, strong safety and fullback. As a senior, Beason rushed for 811 yards and 12 touchdowns at fullback, and made 75 tackles and had five pass interceptions on defense. Beason also ran track and was on the basketball team.

College career
While attending the University of Miami, Beason played for the Miami Hurricanes football team.  He began his career at fullback, but shifted to linebacker as a redshirt freshman. During his career he collected 187 tackles, 3.5 quarterback sacks, and one interception.  He majored in sports administration.

Before the 2006 season, Beason joined the Miami track-and-field team. He competed on the indoor squad during the spring, finishing 18th at the ACC Indoor Track and Field Championships with a season best mark of 6.50 meters in the long jump.

Beason was one of the players in the recording of the song "7th Floor Crew", a lewd rap song about sexual activities on the seventh floor of Mahoney Hall. He went as "Big Beas"

Professional career

2007 NFL Draft

Carolina Panthers
Beason was drafted in the first round with the 25th overall pick in the 2007 NFL Draft by the Carolina Panthers. Beason had a great rookie season, finishing second behind Patrick Willis in tackles for a rookie with 140. He finished second in the NFL Defensive Rookie of the Year voting behind Willis, receiving two votes. During Beason's second year he was selected to his first Pro Bowl and was an AP All-Pro selection after recording 138 tackles and three interceptions.
In the 2009 season Beason recorded three sacks, three interceptions, a forced fumble, and 141 tackles, including 111 solo tackles. As a result, he was a second-team pick on the 2009 All-Pro Team, and also received a spot in the Pro Bowl when Patrick Willis backed out due to injury.
Due to an injury to outside linebacker Thomas Davis, who was placed on the Physically Unable to Perform list, Beason volunteered to move to the outside linebacker position while Davis recovered. However, Davis was not taken off the list by the Panthers, and Beason had to assume the role further until Dan Connor, who had taken over the inside linebacker position, had a season-ending injury, thus moving Beason back inside.
Due to him switching positions, he finished the season with the worst statistical performance of his career, recording only 121 tackles (9 less than fellow Panther James Anderson and the first time in his career he did not place first in team tackles). However, Beason was rewarded for his temporary switch to the position, and was designated a Pro Bowl alternate at the outside linebacker position, and later was awarded a spot when Lance Briggs backed out due to an injury.

On July 28, 2011, Beason and the Panthers agreed to terms on a deal that would make him the highest-paid middle linebacker in NFL history. The deal was worth $50 million over 5 years, with $25 million guaranteed. On September 14, Beason was placed on the injured reserve list with an injured left Achilles tendon. However, in the 2012 NFL season, Beason lost his middle linebacker starting position to Boston College draft pick Luke Kuechly, who would win the Defensive Rookie of the year for the 2012 season.
After starting the first two games of the season, Beason lost his starting job to Chase Blackburn. On October 4, 2013, he was traded to the New York Giants for a 7th round pick. Despite playing in all 64 regular season games, as well as one playoff game, during the first four years of his Panthers career, Beason managed to only appear in five during his last two full seasons with the team.

New York Giants
Beason's play significantly improved as a member of the Giants; in his 12 games with the Giants in the 2013 season they went 7-4 (after an 0-4 start), and he had 93 tackles.
On March 12, 2014, he and the New York Giants came to an agreement on a new contract, signing a three-year $16.8 million deal.
Beason tore a ligament and fractured the sesamoid bone in his toe in a June practice and missed all of training camp and all five of the Giants' preseason games. He played in the first two games of the season but reinjured the toe and missed the next three before returning to play on a limited basis against the Eagles in Week 6 and Cowboys in Week 7. After his visit with doctors, Beason said in a radio interview that he might have to have the season-ending toe surgery to finally take care of the problem, and that turned out to be the case.
On November 7, 2015, Beason was placed on the Giants' injured reserve for ankle and knee injuries, after appearing in only 5 of the Giants eight games. Beason announced his retirement on February 10, 2016. He was scheduled to undergo knee surgery and was told by doctors that it was best he retire. Beason ended up playing just 21 games in 3 seasons with the Giants.

NFL statistics

References

External links

New York Giants bio
Carolina Panthers bio
Miami Hurricanes bio

1985 births
Living people
American football linebackers
Carolina Panthers players
Miami Hurricanes football players
National Conference Pro Bowl players
New York Giants players
People from Miramar, Florida
Players of American football from Florida
Sportspeople from Broward County, Florida
Chaminade-Madonna College Preparatory School alumni